Swart is an Afrikaans, Dutch and German surname meaning "black" (spelled zwart in modern Dutch). Variations on it are de Swart, Swarte, de Swarte, Swarts, Zwart, de Zwart, and Zwarts. People with this surname include:

Alfred L. Swart (1840–?), Wisconsin politician
Alida Swart (born 1975), member of British pop group Vanilla (band)
Amanda Swart, South African biochemist 
Balie Swart (born 1964), South African rugby player
Bonje Swart (born 1949), Dutch singer
Carla Swart (1987–2011), South African road racing cyclist
Charles Robberts Swart (1894–1982), first president of the Republic of South Africa
Claudius Claussoen Swart (born 1388), Danish geographer
Clinton Swart (born 1992), South African rugby player
Colla Swart (born 1930), South African photographer
Daryl Swart, South African drummer of Tree63 (band)
Ed Swart (born 1937), Dutch racing car driver
 (b.1922), botanist with the standard author abbreviation H.J.Swart
Henda Swart (1939–2016), South African mathematician
HP Swart (born 1989), South African rugby player
Jack Swart (born 1954), New Zealand road racing cyclist
Jacobus Swart, Brazilian engineer
Jan Swart van Groningen (1495–1563), Dutch Renaissance painter
Joan Swart (born 1965), South African psychologist
K. W. Swart (1916–1992), Dutch historian
Karin Swart, South African cricketer
Lammert Swart (1847–1909), Dutch general of the Royal Netherlands East Indies Army
Malherbe Swart (born 1991), South African rugby player
Mel Swart (1919–2007), Canadian politician
Michael Swart (born 1982), Dutch cricketer
Peter Swart (1752–1829), New York state court judge
Peter Swart (1946–2000), Zimbabwean cricketer
Riekje Swart (1923-2008), Dutch gallery owner 
Sjaak Swart (born 1938), Dutch footballer
Stephanus Swart (1890–1927), South African farmer and spree killer
Stephen Swart (born 1965), New Zealand road racing cyclist
Steven Swart, South African politician
Valiant Swart (born 1965), South African Afrikaans rock/folk singer
Wayne Swart (born 1986), South African rugby player
William D. Swart (1856–1936), American merchant, manufacturer and politician
De Swart
Henriette de Swart (born 1961), Dutch linguist
Saar de Swart (1861-1951), Dutch sculptor
Swarte
Joost Swarte (born 1947), Dutch cartoonist and graphic designer
Martinus Swarte (1813-1835), Dutch colonial administrator
De Swarte
Michelle de Swarte (born 1980), British model
Vincent de Swarte (1963–2006), French novelist
Swarts
André Swarts (born 1995), South African rugby union player
Bernice Swarts (born 1972), South African politician
David Swarts, New York politician
Frédéric Swarts (1866–1940), Belgian chemist
Hilary Swarts, French wildlife biologist
Leighton Swarts, South African cricketer

See also
Swart, Missouri, a community in the United States
Swart River in South Africa

Dutch-language surnames
Afrikaans-language surnames